Norodom Sihanouk received the following honours:

References

=

Sihanouk, Norodom
Honors